The National University of Trujillo (UNT) is a major public university located in Trujillo, Peru, capital of the department of La Libertad. The university was founded by Simón Bolívar and José Faustino Sánchez Carrión, who met in Huamachuco; they signed the decree of foundation on May 10, 1824, before Peru's independence from Spain.  National University of Trujillo, was the first republican university founded in Peru.

UNT has approximately 16,000 students in 13 academic faculties, making it one of the largest universities in the country. The current rector is Dr. Carlos Vásquez Boyer.

The UNT is ranked as one of the best universities in Peru.

History

The National University of Trujillo is a Peruvian university located in the city of Trujillo, La Libertad Region in northern Peru whose acronym is UNT. It was founded during the Republican era by General Simón Bolívar, who issued from his headquarters in Huamachuco a decree founding the university on May 10, 1824, having as a secretary Don José Faustino Sánchez Carrión. The first director was Don Carlos Pedemonte y Talavera  and whose term begins on October 22, 1831. On 23 November 1831 the Government appointed as supreme patron of the University to St. Thomas and St. Rose of Lima, where it ran. The first colleges environments were inside the school founded by bishops El Salvador. The first classes were Dogmatic and Moral Theology, Canons and Laws, Anatomy and Medicine, Philosophy and Mathematics. The first academic degrees awarded by UNT were those of Bachelor, Master and Doctor of Laws and Sacred Canons. It adopts the College system starting in 1861. From Its classrooms exited the universal poet César Vallejo in 1916, the first political philosopher Antenor Orregoin 1928, Víctor Raúl Haya de la Torre, Eduardo González Viaña, Carlos Hugo Garrido Chalén, among others.

Schools

UNT is organized into 13 schools which contain 37 professional departments.

Notable alumni
Among former renowned professors and students are:
César Vallejo, poet and journalist. Thomas Merton called him "the greatest universal poet since Dante". The late British poet, critic and biographer Martin Seymour-Smith, a leading authority on world literature, called Vallejo "the greatest twentieth-century poet in any language." He also was leader of the cultural group in Trujillo city called Grupo Norte (North Group).
Abundio Sagástegui Alva, biologist. He has proposed about four new genus and 88 new species, based on Peruvian botanical diversity.
Víctor Raúl Haya de la Torre, political leader who founded the American Popular Revolutionary Alliance (APRA) political movement. He is recognized as the most influential Peruvian political leader of the twentieth century and one of the most important Latin American political ideologues.
María Julia Mantilla García, Miss World 2004.
Carlos Hugo Garrido Chalén, writer and poet.
Eduardo González Viaña, writer and journalist.
Antenor Orrego, political philosopher.
Ciro Alegría, novelist, writer and journalist.
Allan Wagner Tizón, diplomat.

See also 
North Group

References

External links
Official Site

Universities in Peru
Educational institutions established in 1824
Universities in Trujillo, Peru